Scandal Sheet is a 1985 American made-for-television drama film directed by David Lowell Rich and starring Burt Lancaster. The film first aired on ABC on January 21, 1985.

Plot
Harold Fallen (Burt Lancaster) a sleazy tabloid publisher in Scandal Sheet. Interested only in selling papers, Fallen sees an easy target in a recovering alcoholic actor Ben Rowan (Robert Urich) trying to make a comeback. Reporter Helen Grant (Pamela Reed) is in serious economic trouble, and Fallen hires her to dig up dirt on the actor due to her close friendship with his wife (Lauren Hutton). Helen must now choose between her friendship and journalistic integrity on one hand and her desperation and Harold Fallen persuasive ways on the other.

Cast

References 
The Cinema History of Burt Lancaster by David Fury
Burt Lancaster: A Filmography and Biography by Ed Andreychuk

External links

1985 television films
1985 films
1985 drama films
Films directed by David Lowell Rich
Films produced by Irwin Winkler
Films scored by Randy Edelman
American drama television films
1980s English-language films
1980s American films